Bodaghabad may refer to:
 Bodaghabad, Isfahan
 Bodaghabad, Razavi Khorasan